Ekrem Çelebi (born 17 September 1965 in Patnos, Turkey) is a Turkish politician and member of Turkish Parliament. He is a member of Justice and development party in Turkey and deputy for Ağrı.

References 

Living people
1965 births
Turkish political people